This article shows all participating water polo team squads at the 2014 Women's European Water Polo Championship, held in Hungary from 16 to 26 July 2014.

















References

Women
Women's European Water Polo Championship
European Water Polo Championship squads
Euro